Jack Merriott RI, ROI, RSMA, RWS (15 November 1901 – 1968) was an English writer, artist, and poster designer famous for his artworks produced for British Railways and the General Post Office.

Bibliography
 (Volume 8 of Artist's Handbooks.)

See also
Claude Buckle
Frank Henry Mason
Frank Newbould

References

External links

1901 births
1968 deaths
Painters from London
20th-century English painters
English male painters
Landscape artists
British railway artists
English watercolourists
British poster artists
20th-century English male artists